Rabo de Lagartixa ("gecko's tail") is a Brazilian instrumental Choro ensemble founded in the 1990s by Daniela Spielmann on Saxophone(soprano and alto), Alessandro Valente and Jayme Vignoli on cavaquinho, Marcello Gonçalves on Seven-string guitar, Alexandre Brasil  on Double Bass (acoustic and electric) and Beto Cazes on Percussions.

Discography
 Quebra-queixo (1998) Malandro Records CD 
 1º Compasso. Samba e Choro (Vários) (2001) Selo Biscoito Fino CD 
 2º Compasso. Samba e Choro (Vários) (2001) Selo Biscoito Fino CD

Música popular brasileira musical groups
Choro
Malandro Records artists
Musical groups established in the 1990s
1990s establishments in Brazil